Lalisa (stylized in all caps) is the debut single album by Thai rapper and singer Lisa, a member of South Korean girl group Blackpink. It was released on September 10, 2021, by YG Entertainment and Interscope Records. The album is a hip hop record produced by Teddy, 24, and R. Tee and received mixed reviews by critics.

The physical version debuted at number one on the Gaon Album Chart, becoming the best-selling album by a female soloist in the chart's history, and set the record for the highest first-week sales among all female acts with 736,221 copies sold. It was certified double platinum by the Korea Music Content Association (KMCA) in November 2021 for selling 500,000 album-equivalent units.

"Lalisa" was released as the lead single on the same day the album was released. The song debuted at number two on the Billboard Global 200 and number 84 on the US Billboard Hot 100. The B-side track "Money" was sent to US contemporary hit radio on November 9 following its success, and peaked at number 10 on the Billboard Global 200 and at number 90 on the US Billboard Hot 100.

Background 
On April 19, 2021, an official from YG Entertainment revealed to South Korean media outlet The Korea Herald that Lisa would debut as the third soloist from her group (after her group-mates Jennie and Rosé respectively) with schedules later to be officially announced through a notice. On July 12, through Star News, her label revealed filming for her music video was underway. On July 25, the singer uploaded two images from her in a recording studio onto her Instagram stories, where a close-up of a screen is shown alongside two different soundwaves and the caption "What’s my name?", hinting at the single album's title.

Release and promotion 
On August 25, 2021, YG Entertainment uploaded a teaser poster with the album's title, named after her given name, with pre-orders starting that same date. On August 27, YG released a 26-second teaser showcasing one of the visual concepts of the album. On August 30, it was confirmed by YG that the title track of the album would also be named "Lalisa". The full tracklist was released on September 5. The album was released worldwide on September 10 through YG and Interscope in conjunction with the music video for its eponymous single. Leading up to the release of the solo, Lisa held an online live countdown event on social media platforms V Live and TikTok to talk about the album and the music video. On September 11, Lisa gave an interview on The Woody Show as a special guest, marking her first appearance on a Thai talk show. On September 14, the artist held a special live broadcast on Naver Now to promote the single album. On November 12, Lisa held an Audacy Check In interview. On November 18, Lisa appeared as a guest on The Zach Sang Show and the radio show 102.7KIISFM.

Singles 
"Lalisa" was released as the lead single alongside the release of the single album and received a music video on September 10, 2021. The music video recorded 73.6 million views on YouTube in 24 hours, becoming the most-viewed music video in the first 24 hours on the platform by a solo artist, breaking a record held by Taylor Swift's "Me!" featuring Brendon Urie. The song debuted at number two on the Billboard Global 200 and Global Excl. U.S., marking Lisa's first solo entry and top-ten song on the charts. In the United States, "Lalisa" debuted at number 84 on the Billboard Hot 100.

The B-side track "Money" received a dance performance video on September 24, 2021. Following the song's rising success globally and in the United States, the song was sent as a single to US contemporary hit radio on November 9, 2021. "Money" peaked at number ten on the Billboard Global 200 and number seven on the Global Excl. U.S., becoming Lisa's second top-ten song on the charts. In the United States, the song peaked at number 90 on the Billboard Hot 100 as well.

Live performances 
On September 10, Lisa made the debut performance of the title track "Lalisa" on The Tonight Show Starring Jimmy Fallon. She then performed the song on Naver Now on September 14. Lisa performed the song on SBS's Inkigayo on September 19, on MBC's Show! Music Core on September 25, and again on SBS's Inkigayo on September 26.

Critical reception 

Lalisa received mixed reviews from music critics, who praised Lisa's performance and charisma but criticized the songs' lyrics and production. Rhian Daly writing for NME called the album "disappointingly flat" pointing out the poor quality in song production. She described the single "Lalisa" as "an awkward song" and felt that B-side track "Money" was even more disappointing. Allison S. Park of The Harvard Crimson stated that Lisa's "formidable rapping skills shine through" but also criticized the "absence of a cohesive lyrical narrative" in the lead single. 

Chase McMullen writing for Beats Per Minute felt that Lisa's confident performance took center stage and praised her ability to transition smoothly between parts in the song "as to make each component feel perfectly natural". Jenna Guillaume writing for MTV praised Lisa's rapping, singing, and dancing skills. Writing for Pinkvilla, Anwaya Mane praised Lisa's "bold and confident rap" and her "inimitable and awe-inspiring high-energy performances" as well. She described "Money" as "a smooth, flowy and conversational kind of rap" which showcased Lisa's different side.

Awards and nominations

Commercial performance
Lalisa surpassed 700,000 pre-orders within four days, setting a new record for the highest number of pre-orders for a single album among K-pop female solo artists. As of September 10, the single album had surpassed 800,000 pre-orders. According to Korea's Hanteo Chart, the single album sold 330,129 copies on the first day and 736,221 copies on the first week of release, setting the record for the highest first-week sales among all female artists and making Lisa the first female soloist to achieve 500,000 copies in first-week sales. The physical edition went on to debut at number one on the Gaon Album Chart, while the kit debuted at number four. In November 2021, Lalisa was certified double platinum by the Korea Music Content Association (KMCA) for selling over 500,000 copies.

Track listing

Notes
 All tracks are stylized in all caps.

Credits and personnel
Personnel details are adapted from Lalisas liner notes booklet.

 Lalisa Manobalcreative director
 Teddy Parkproduction, creative director
 24production
 R. Teeproduction
 Yong In Choirecording, production engineer
 Yongju Bangrecording, production engineer
 Jason Roberts from The Lab, LAmixing
 Chris Gehringer from Sterling Sound, NJmastering
 Hyojin Jeongdesign
 Sungmin Yookdesign
 Minkyu Leedesign

 Heewon Moondesign
 Minji Leedesign
 Ji Yong Yoonphotographer
 Jae Hyun Choevisual director
 Bin Seovisual director
 Gee Eunstylist
 Min Hee Parkstylist
 Seon Yeong Leehair
 Myung Sun Lee from Woosunmakeup
 Eunkyung Park from Unistellanails
 Yoon Jeong Kimpublishing

Charts

Weekly charts

Monthly charts

Year-end charts

Certifications and sales

|}

Release history

See also
List of certified albums in South Korea
List of Gaon Album Chart number ones of 2021

Notes

References

Single albums
YG Entertainment albums
Interscope Records albums
2021 debut albums